Biłyk is the seventh studio album by Ukrainian singer Iryna Bilyk released on 5 June 2002 by Mamamusic Polska and Universal Music Polska. Most of the songs on the album are recorded in Polish.

Overview
All the songs were originally written in Ukrainian, but later were translated into Polish by Michał Kużmiński. Songs "Nie dziś" ("Odynokaya"), "Zaśnij" ("Skazhi"), "Deszcz" ("Doshchem") and "Bez nazwy" ("Bez nazvy") appeared on previous Bilyk's albums.

Lyrics for the song "Sierota" (in Ukrainian version "Banduriste, orle syzyi...") was written by Ukrainian writer Taras Shevchenko.

In August 2002 she participated in Festiwal Polskich Wideoklipów Yacht Film (Poland), and was awarded the Pochesny Yacht Award in the category "Discovery of the year".

Some songs later appeared on the album Kraina (2003) in Ukrainian.

Track listing

Personnel
 Irina Bilyk – lead vocals (all tracks), songwriting (3-5, 7–9, 11, 12), production (all tracks)
 Serhii Dotsenko – songwriting (1, 2, 4), keyboards (1-5, 7-11), guitar (7), percussion (2), background vocals (2-5, 7, 10)
 Oleksandr Tyshchenko – songwriting (10)
 Yevhen – keyboards (6), songwriting (6), recording (6), mixing (6)
 Vitalii Telezin – recording (6), mixing (6)
 Michał Kuźmiński – songwriting (1-9, 11)
 Taras Shevchenko – songwriting (10)
 Fedir Mlynchenko – songwriting (12)
 Oleh Barabash – recording (11), recording (11), mixing (11)
 Zhan Bolotov – keyboards (11, 12), recording (11, 12), mixing (11, 12)
 Serhii Dobrovolskyi – guitar (1-5, 7-11), recording (1-10, 12), mixing (1-10, 12)
 Mikhailo Oleksiiv – guitar (6) 
 Vitalii Savenko – bass guitar (10)  
 Eduard Kosse – bayan (7, 11, 12)
 Alik Fantaiev – drums (6)
 Serhiy Mytrofanov – violin (6) 
 Rostyslav Buh – violin (6)
 Maksym Symchych – viola (6)
 Yakiv Dushakov – cello (6)
 Oles Zhuravchak – flute (3, 11)
 Volodymyr Kopot – trumpet (11, 12)
 Volodymyr Pushkar – trombone (12)
 Serhiy Klymchenko – tuba (12)

References

2002 albums
Iryna Bilyk albums
Mamamusic albums
Universal Music Group albums
Polish-language albums
Ukrainian-language albums